Tharida (also referred to as tharidat Ghassan) is a soup in Arab cuisine prepared with broth, stewed meat and bread crumbs that are crumbled using one's fingers; the bread crumbs serve to thicken the soup. It was sometimes prepared using brains for the meat. Additional ingredients that can be used include beans, crushed or pounded walnuts, yogurt, mint and spices. It may have a milky appearance. Hundreds of variations and recipes exist for the dish.

History
Tharida served as a symbol of Arab identity during the "early years of Islam". The soup received praise from the Islamic prophet Muhammad, who stated that tharida surpasses other dishes, also making a comparison to Aisha, his favorite wife, stating that 'Aisha surpasses other women'.

See also

 List of ancient dishes and foods
 List of soups

Notes

References

Ancient dishes
Soups